Mitchell Dean Webster (born May 16, 1959) is a former outfielder in Major League Baseball who played from 1983 through 1995 for the Toronto Blue Jays, Montreal Expos, Chicago Cubs, Cleveland Indians, Pittsburgh Pirates and Los Angeles Dodgers. Listed at 6' 0", 185 lb., he was a switch hitter and threw left handed.

Playing career
Born in  Larned, Kansas, Webster was selected by the Dodgers in the 23rd round of the 1977 MLB Draft. He then was selected by Toronto from Los Angeles in the 1979 Minor League draft.

A speedy outfielder, Webster achieved good production from both sides of the plate, and also had a strong arm with the ability to play all three outfield positions exceptionally well.

His most productive season came with Montreal in 1986, when he posted career-highs with a .290 batting average and 36 stolen bases while leading the National League with 13 triples.

Webster's 1990 season with the Cleveland Indians featured a bench clearing incident between Webster and Todd Stottlemyre of the Toronto Blue Jays. In the action, Webster charged the mound but was tackled by Stottlemyre and catcher Pat Borders.

In a 13-season career, Webster slashed .263/.330/.401 with 70 home runs and 160 steals in 1,265 games, driving in 342 runs and scoring 504 times while playing mostly as a leadoff hitter.

As an outfielder, he committed just 42 errors in 2,007 fielding chances for a .979 fielding percentage.

Post-playing career
Webster scouted during 14 years with the Dodgers organization, serving for eight seasons as an amateur scout before working in 2008 and 2009 as a professional scout, being responsible for signing such players as Blake DeWitt, Scott Elbert, Joel Hanrahan, Koyie Hill, Lucas May, Bubba Starling, and Scott Van Slyke, among others. He also spent four seasons as a coach in the Dodgers minor league system from 1996 to 1999. 

In 2009, the Kansas City Royals named Webster as their Midwest Regional Scouting Supervisor.  He was named to the Kansas Sports Hall of Fame in 2018.

See also
 List of Major League Baseball annual triples leaders
 List of Major League Baseball career stolen bases leaders

Sources

External links
, or Retrosheet
Pelota Binaria (Venezuelan Winter League)

1959 births
Living people
American expatriate baseball players in Canada
Baseball coaches from Kansas
Baseball players from Kansas
Cardenales de Lara players
American expatriate baseball players in Venezuela
Chicago Cubs players
Cleveland Indians players
Clinton Dodgers players
Kansas City Royals scouts
Kinston Eagles players
Knoxville Blue Jays players
Lethbridge Dodgers players
Los Angeles Dodgers players
Los Angeles Dodgers scouts
Major League Baseball outfielders
Minor league baseball coaches
Montreal Expos players
People from Larned, Kansas
Pittsburgh Pirates players
Syracuse Chiefs players
Toronto Blue Jays players